Merchants of death was an epithet used in the U.S. in the 1930s to attack industries and banks that had supplied and funded World War I (then called the Great War).

Origin
The term originated in 1932 as the title of an article about an arms dealer named Basil Zaharoff: "Zaharoff, Merchant of Death".  It was then borrowed for the title of the book  Merchants of Death (1934), an exposé by H. C. Engelbrecht and F. C. Hanighen.

United States
The term was popular in antiwar circles of both the left and the right, and was used extensively regarding the Senate hearings in 1936 by the Nye Committee. The Senate hearing examined how much influence the manufacturers of armaments had in the American decision to enter World War I.  Ninety-three hearings were held, over 200 witnesses were called, and little hard evidence of a conspiracy was found.  The Nye Committee came to an end when Chairman Nye accused President Woodrow Wilson of withholding information from Congress when he chose to enter World War I.  The failure of the committee to find a conspiracy did not change public prejudice against the manufactures of armaments, thus the popular name "merchants of death".

Nye Report findings 
Extraordinary arms sales produce fear, hostility, greater munitions orders, economic strain and collapse or war. Munitions companies engaged in bribery of foreign governmental officials to secure business. Profits flowed from German orders for aviation materiel. Munitions companies evaded the embargo of arms to China. The committee also found price-fixing agreements and profit-sharing arrangements.

Great Britain
Similar allegations in Great Britain resulted in a major government inquiry in 1935–1936.

Book topics 
Merchants of Death (1934) covers the history of the Arms industry. Featured companies include DuPont, Colt, Remington, Vickers, Schneider-Creusot, Krupp, and Škoda Works. Individuals include Hiram Maxim and Basil Zaharoff. Arms profits before and during World War I are compared.:159 The growth of Japanese armaments is covered.

See also
 H. C. Engelbrecht
 F. C. Hanighen
 Nye Committee
 Basil Zaharoff
 Causes of World War I
 Neutrality Acts of the 1930s
 Business Plot
 Military-digital complex
 Viktor Bout

References

Further reading
 Anderson, David G. “British Rearmament and the ‘Merchants of Death’: The 1935-36 Royal Commission on the Manufacture of and Trade in Armaments.” Journal of Contemporary History 29#1 (1994), pp. 5–37, online.
 
 
 Coulter, Matthew Ware. The Senate Munitions Inquiry of the 1930s: Beyond the Merchants of Death (Greenwood, 1997).
 Engelbrecht, H. C., and F.C. Hanighen. Merchants of Death (Dodd, Mead, 1934) online

 Tooley, T. Hunt. " Merchants Of Death Revisited: Armaments, Bankers, and the First World War." Journal of Libertarian Studies, 19#1 (2005) pp. 37–78. online
 Vergne, Jean-Philippe. "Stigmatized categories and public disapproval of organizations: A mixed-methods study of the global arms industry, 1996–2007." Academy of Management Journal 55.5 (2012): 1027-1052. online
 Wiltz, John E. In Search of Peace: the Senate munitions inquiry, 1934-36 (1963), detailed history of Nye Committee online

 

Anti-war movement
Military–industrial complex
United States in World War I